Kosappur is a developing residential area in North Chennai, India.

Location
Kosappur is located in North Chennai with  Mathur, Chinna Mathur and Madhavaram Milk Colony to the South. Other neighbouring areas includes Manali, Madhavaram, Manjambakkam, and Chettimedu to the west and Theeyambakkam to the north.

The arterial roads to Kosappur are the Anna Salai (Andarkuppam-Redhills Road), Madhavaram Milk Colony Road and the Kamarajar Salai. This part of Chennai was considered socially unappealing a decade ago. However, due to rapid increase in need for quality affordable residential areas in and around Chennai, Kosappur became popular among real estate developers. With the opening of the Inner Ring Road, the area became easily accessible from the Chennai Mofussil Bus Terminus, increasing its popularity.

Transportation

References

External links
Corporation of Chennai

Neighbourhoods in Chennai
Suburbs of Chennai